Catocala flebilis, the mourning underwing, is a moth of the family Erebidae. The species was first described by Augustus Radcliffe Grote in 1872. It is found in North America from Massachusetts and Connecticut south to North Carolina and Georgia, west to Arkansas and north to Michigan and Illinois and into southern Ontario.

The wingspan is 45–65 mm. Adults are on wing from July to September depending on the location.

The larvae feed on Carya glabra and Carya ovata.

References

External links
Species info

Moths described in 1872
flebilis
Moths of North America